Richard Yates  may refer to:

People 

Richard Yates (actor) (1706–1796), English comic actor
Richard Yates (antiquary) (1769–1834), English cleric
Richard Yates (politician, born 1815) (1815–1873), 13th Governor of Illinois (1861–1865), U.S. Senator from Illinois (1865–1871), U.S. Congressman from Illinois (1851–1855), member of Illinois House of Representatives (1842–1845, 1848–1849)
Richard Yates, Jr. (1860–1936), his son, 22nd Governor of Illinois (1901–1905), U.S. Congressman from Illinois (1919–1933)
Dick Yates (1921–1976), Welsh footballer
Richard Yates (novelist) (1926–1992), American novelist and short-story writer
Richard Yates (athlete) (born 1986), English athlete

Novels 

Richard Yates (novel), 2010 novel by Tao Lin

Human name disambiguation pages